The Medicine Bottle is a 1909 American silent thriller film written and directed by D. W. Griffith, produced by the American Mutoscope and Biograph Company in New York City, and starring Florence Lawrence, Adele DeGarde, and  Marion Leonard. At its release in March 1909, the short was distributed to theaters on a "split reel", which was a single projection reel that accommodated more than one film. This drama shared its reel with another Biograph short directed by Griffith, the comedy Jones and His New Neighbors.

Original contact-print paper rolls of both motion pictures, as well as projectable safety-stock copies of them, are preserved in the Library of Congress.

Plot
The drama presents a suspenseful story involving two small, nearly identical bottles: one filled with a much-needed liquid medicine; the other, with a topical antiseptic solution that is a deadly poison if taken internally. After the bottles accidentally get switched, a young woman in a desperate race against time tries repeatedly to telephone her seven-year-old daughter Alice to prevent the girl from giving her sick grandmother the poison. A more detailed description of the plot follows, one published in the April 3, 1909 issue of the New York trade publication The Film Index:

Cast

 Florence Lawrence as Mrs. Ross
 Adele DeGarde as Alice, Mrs. Ross's daughter
 Marion Leonard as Mrs. Parker
 Linda Arvidson as telephone operator
 Anita Hendrie as party guest
 Dorothy West as party guest
 David Miles as party guest
 Herbert Yost as party guest
 Mack Sennett as party guest
 Jeanie MacPherson in unverified role (possibly a telephone operator)
 Min Johnson in unverified role (possibly another telephone operator)

Production
The screenplay for this short is credited to D. W. Griffith, who also directed the picture at Biograph's main studio, which in 1909 was located inside a large renovated brownstone mansion in New York City, in Manhattan, at 11 East 14th Street. The drama was filmed there on interior sets in four dayson February 3, 4, 10, and 16, 1909by Biograph cinematographer G. W. "Billy" Bitzer.

Sets and editing
Set composition, lighting, and filming The Medicine Bottle were collaborative efforts between Griffith and Bitzer, who used three interior sets or "units" at Biograph's Manhattan facility in making this production: a home interior where the bottle of poison and the bottle of medicine for the sick grandmother are accidentally switched; the parlor where the Mrs. Ross attends a party with friends and where she discovers the bottle mix-up; and finally the telephone exchange, where Mrs. Ross tries desperately to call her daughter and connect with young Alice through "a rather lazy crew of telephone operators." American film historian and university professor Joyce E. Jesionowski in her 1987 book Thinking in Pictures: Dramatic Structure in D. W. Griffith's Biograph Films regards The Medicine Bottle as a notable production in the director's early filmography, a release that illustrates his growing awareness of the power of film editing, in particular the intersplicing of close-ups to underscore visually important actions in a scene as well as the impact of quick back-and-forth cutting between sets to build dramatic tension for audiences. According to Jesionowski, the editing that Griffith employed in this short thriller redefined the need for actual extended physical space to represent distance on screen:
Jesionowski's observations regarding Griffith's increased attention to camera setups and editing may explain why a short like The Medicine Bottle, which required no location shooting and had a final print length of only seven minutesa runtime even quite modest by 1909 production standardsrequired four days to shoot.

Biograph's uncredited actors
Identifying cast members in early Biograph releases such as The Medicine Bottle is made more difficult by the fact that the studio, as a matter of company policy, did not begin publicly crediting its performers on screen, in trade publications, or in newspaper advertisements until years after this short's release. All the players in this short were not credited in their roles on screen and in print, as were the rest of Biograph's relatively small staff of "photoplayers" and crew members in other productions in 1909. At the time of this thriller's release, Lawrence was already gaining widespread celebrity among filmgoers. Few people, though, outside the motion picture industry knew her name, so in 1909 and for the remainder of her time working at Biograph, the actress was referred to by admirers and in news articles in the media simply as "the Biograph girl". Publicly, the studio would not reveal the names of its actors or credit them on screen and in film promotions until 1913.

Linda Arvidson, who portrays one of the telephone operators in this production, was actually the wife of D. W. Griffith in 1909. If fact, the couple had married three years earlier. Biograph's policy of not identifying cast or crew extended as well to both Arvidson and Griffith, neither of whom received a screen credit, any specific recognition in advertisements for the film, nor was mentioned in any other publicity for The Medicine Bottle.

Release and reception

After their release on March 29, 1909, The Medicine Bottle and its split-reel companion  Jones and His New Neighbors circulated to theaters throughout the United States and continued to be promoted for weeks in film-industry publications and then advertised in city and small-town newspapers well into 1910. Alfred Gleason, a reviewer for Variety and a founding member of the popular New York trade paper's editorial staff, was particularly impressed with the pace and "unique" structure of The Medicine Bottle. In his April 3, 1909 review titled "'The Wrong Bottle' Manhattan", Greason, writing under the pen name "Rush", alludes to the effective work of Biograph's uncredited "producer", a term that in 1909 was used synonymously with the position of director on screen productions:

Additional 1909 reactions to film
Critical reactions to the film were not universally positive in 1909. Reviewers for the trade journal The Moving Picture World were not as impressed as Greason with the content and overall structure of the film. In the journal's April 3 issuethe same date of issue as the cited Variety issuea staff reviewer simply identified as "The Kicker" criticizes the plot for being muddled in its early scenes, resulting in giving many theatergoers an initial "bad impression" that the bottle switch was not accidental but deliberate, an act done with murderous intent:

"The Kicker" continues his criticism of the film in the same April 3 review, contending that the flippant portrayal of the telephone operators as being extremely irresponsible while on duty is wholly unrealistic and a true insult to that workforce:Another reviewer, an anonymous one in the same issue of The Moving Picture World, judges the drama's acting to be "especially good" but also notes, "The action in some parts is too long drawn out."

The "thriller" continues to circulate

By October 1909, the two split-reel shorts were still being widely distributed and were finally reaching many small-town theaters. A writer that month for the newspaper The Brunswick News in Georgia was highly complimentary of The Medicine Bottle, but, unlike Alfred Greason, he evidently did not even see the film before providing readers with his brief assessment of the production. Possibly confusing the thriller with Jones and His New Neighbors, the reviewer in the October 7 issue of The Brunswick News confidently declares, "'The Medicine Bottle' is another comedy drama full of fun", adding "If this picture does not make you laugh nothing will." Three months laterover 4,100 miles from Brunswick and nearly a year after the release of The Medicine Bottle and its split-reel companioncopies of the shorts finally arrived in the United States territory of Alaska, in the port town of Skagway. There the thriller was advertised on January 27, 1910, issue of The Daily Alaskan as a "Remarkably good drama" and promoted as an upcoming attraction being presented at the local Elks' Hall with the "screaming farce" Jones and His New Neighbors, which the newspaper misidentifies and misspells in its advertisement as "Mr. Jones in the W[r]ong House". Five additional motion pictures were promoted as well on the same bill, with the main feature being footage of the heavyweight championship fight between boxers Jack Johnson and Stanley Ketchel, a bout that had occurred three months earlier in Colma, California before a crowd of 10,000 spectators.

Preservation status
Photographic prints and a film negative and positive of The Medicine Bottle survive in the Library of Congress (LC), which holds a 206-foot paper roll of contact prints produced directly frame-by-frame from the comedy's original 35mm master negative. Submitted by Biograph to the United States government in 1909, shortly before the film's release, the roll is part of the original documentation required by federal authorities for motion-picture companies to obtain copyright protection for their productions. While the LC's paper roll of the film is certainly not projectable, a negative copy of the roll's paper images was made and transferred onto modern polyester-based safety film stock to produce a positive print for screening. Those copies were made as part of a preservation project carried out during the 1950s and early 1960s by Kemp R. Niver and other LC staff, who restored more than 3,000 early paper rolls of film images from the library's collection and created safety-stock copies.

See also
D. W. Griffith filmography

Notes

References

External links

 

1909 films
American thriller films
1909 short films
American silent short films
American black-and-white films
Biograph Company films
Films directed by D. W. Griffith
Films shot in New York City
Films shot in New York (state)
Silent thriller films
1900s American films